The Quiet American is a 2002 political drama film and the adaptation of Graham Greene's bestselling 1955 novel set in Vietnam, The Quiet American. It is directed by Phillip Noyce and stars Michael Caine, Brendan Fraser, and Do Thi Hai Yen.

The 2002 version of The Quiet American, in contrast to the 1958 film version, depicted Greene's original ending and treatment of the principal American character, Pyle. Like the novel, the film illustrates Pyle's moral culpability in arranging terrorist actions aimed at the French colonial government and the Viet Minh. Going beyond Greene's original work, the film used a montage ending with superimposed images of American soldiers from the intervening decades of the Vietnam War.

Miramax paid $5.5 million for the rights to distribute the film in North America and some other territories, but it shelved the film for a year due to the September 11 attacks and the film's "unpatriotic" message. The film finally received an Oscar qualification release in November 2002 and went on to gross US$12.9 million in limited theatrical release in the United States. The film received positive reviews from critics and Caine was nominated for the Academy Award for Best Actor.

Plot
The story is set in 1952 in Saigon, Vietnam (French Indochina at that time), toward the end of the First Indochina War (1946–1954) in which French forces fought the Communist-led Viet Minh rebels. On one level, The Quiet American is a love story about the triangle that develops between Thomas Fowler, a British journalist in his fifties; Alden Pyle, a young American idealist, supposedly an aid worker; and Phuong, a young Vietnamese woman. On another level it is also about the growing American involvement that led to the full-scale American war in Vietnam.

Thomas Fowler, who narrates the story, is involved in the war only as a reporter, an unengaged observer, apart from one crucial event. Pyle, who represents America and its policies in Vietnam, is a CIA operative sent to steer the war according to America’s interests, and is passionately devoted to the ideas of an American foreign policy theorist who said that what Vietnam needed was a "third force" to take the place of both the colonialists and the Vietnamese rebels and restore order. Pyle sets about creating a "Third Force" against the French and the Viet Minh by using a Vietnamese splinter group headed by corrupt militia leader General Thé (based on the actual Trinh Minh Thế). His arming of Thé's militia with American weaponry leads to a series of terrorist bombings in Saigon. These bombings, blamed on the Communists in order to further American outrage, kill a number of innocent people, including women and children.

Meanwhile, Pyle has taken Fowler's Vietnamese mistress Phuong, promising her marriage and security.  When Fowler finds out about Pyle's involvement in the bombings, he takes one definitive action. He silently agrees to enable his assistant, Hinh, and Hinh's Communist cohorts to take Pyle captive; when Pyle tries to flee, Hinh fatally stabs him. Phuong subsequently returns to Fowler, and while the local French police commander suspects Fowler had a role in Pyle's murder, he has no evidence and does not pursue the matter.

Cast

 Michael Caine as Thomas Fowler
 Brendan Fraser as Alden Pyle
 Do Thi Hai Yen as Phuong
 Rade Šerbedžija as Inspector Vigot
 Tzi Ma as Hinh
 Robert Stanton as Joe Tunney
 Holmes Osborne as Bill Granger
 Quang Hai as General Trình Minh Thế

Production
The film was shot in Hanoi, Saigon, Ninh Bình and Hội An in Vietnam.

Reception
The film earned positive reviews from critics, currently holding an 87% rating on Rotten Tomatoes based on 156 reviews, and an average rating of 7.65/10, with the consensus: "Thoughtful and wonderfully acted, The Quiet American manages to capture the spirit of Green[e]'s novel." It also has a score of 84 out of 100 on Metacritic, based on 39 critics, indicating "universal acclaim".

The first rough cut was screened to a test audience on September 10, 2001 and received positive ratings. However, the September 11 attacks took place the next day, and audience ratings dropped with each subsequent screening. Reacting to criticism of the film's "unpatriotic" message, Miramax shelved the film for a year. It was finally screened publicly at the Toronto International Film Festival in September 2002 to critical acclaim. The film received an Oscar qualification release in November 2002 and a limited release in January 2003.

Accolades
Academy Awards
 Best Actor (Michael Caine) - Nominated

Golden Globe Awards
 Best Actor – Motion Picture Drama (Michael Caine) - Nominated

BAFTA Awards
 Best Actor in a Leading Role (Michael Caine) - Nominated

American Film Institute Awards
 Movie of the Year - Won

London Film Critics' Circle Awards
 Director of the Year (Phillip Noyce) - Won
 Actor of the Year (Michael Caine) - Won

National Board of Review
 Best Director (Phillip Noyce) - Won
 Top Ten Films - Won

National Society of Film Critics Awards
 Best Actor (Michael Caine) - 2nd place

Satellite Awards
 Best Motion Picture, Drama (Phillip Noyce) - Nominated
 Best Director (Phillip Noyce) - Nominated
 Best Actor - Motion Picture, Drama (Michael Caine) - Won
 Best Supporting Actress - Motion Picture, Drama (Đỗ Thị Hải Yến) - Nominated

See also
 List of historical drama films of Asia

References

External links
 
 
 
 
 "By the Bombs' Early Light" - essay by H. Bruce Franklin on the historical context of the novel and the 2002 film
 "Michael Caine Makes Noise: He dismisses claims that The Quiet American is somehow anti-American" - Interview with film critic Joe Leydon on controversies surrounding the film

2002 films
2002 thriller drama films
American thriller drama films
American political thriller films
British thriller drama films
French thriller drama films
German thriller drama films
English-language French films
English-language German films
2000s French-language films
Cold War films
Films about war correspondents
Films based on British novels
Films based on works by Graham Greene
Films scored by Craig Armstrong (composer)
Films directed by Phillip Noyce
Films set in 1952
Films set in the French colonial empire
Films set in French Indochina
Films set in Vietnam
Films shot in Vietnam
Political thriller films
Vietnam War films
2002 drama films
2000s English-language films
2000s American films
2000s British films
2000s French films
2000s German films